Argentine Pass, elevation , is a high mountain pass that crosses the Continental Divide in the Front Range of the Rocky Mountains of central Colorado in the United States.

Some early references use other names for the pass.  An 1867 description of the trip from Georgetown into the valley of the Snake River refers to it as Sanderson Pass.  A lithograph caption from 1869 calls it the Snake River Pass.

Geography
To the east is the valley of Leavenworth Creek, a tributary that joins the South Clear Creek south of Georgetown. To the west is the Horseshoe Basin, a deep glacial cirque at the head of the Peru Creek, a tributary that joins the Snake River just north of Montezuma.

The continental divide at Argentine Pass serves as the boundary between Clear Creek and Summit counties.

The pass was formerly used by a toll road and stagecoach route.  The trail on the west side of the pass is the remains of this road.  To the east, the  Argentine Central Railway ran from Georgetown to the pass from 1906 to 1918.  The Jeep trail to the pass follows the grade of this abandoned railroad.

History
On Sept. 14, 1864, former provisional territorial governor Robert Steele, along with James Huff and Robert Layton discovered silver high on the slopes of McClellan Mountain, 1.85 mi (2.97 km) north of what we now call Argentine Pass.  The mountains of this region are predominantly granite and gneiss, with veins containing silver-rich galena and blende (sphalerite), as well as iron pyrite, cupriferous pyrite (chalcopyrite), and some tetrahedrite.   This was the first major discovery of silver ore in Colorado.  They named the deposit the Belmont Lode (from the French for beautiful mountain), and the surrounding area came to be known as the Argentine mining district (from argentum, Latin for silver).  The discovery led to the growth of Georgetown as an early center of the silver mining industry in Colorado, although development was slowed by a general ignorance of how to properly treat the ore, by the high cost of transportation from the mines, and by the climate at that altitude.  Eventually, both sides of the pass were heavily mined, and the district was divided into the East Argentine and West Argentine Districts, divided by the pass.  Many remains of mining activity remain visible today.

Work began on a toll road over Argentine Pass in 1869; the toll was typically one dollar for a team and wagon. In 1883, the road was purchased by Clear Creek and Summit County as a public highway; in the same year, the Denver, South Park and Pacific Railroad reached Dillon, diverting most of the freight traffic from the toll road. Under county management, the road was never well maintained, and it gradually became impassable to teams and wagons. The town of Waldorf was established as a rest stop on the east side of the pass.

In 1875, the Hayden Survey reported the Argentine Pass wagon road to be the highest wagon road in Colorado; at the time, it was the primary route from Georgetown to the mining camps in the Blue River Valley (Breckenridge and Montezuma).

Colorado Telephone laid the first telephone line across Argentine Pass in 1899; this was a twisted-pair line resting directly on the ground, but it was replaced a year later with submarine cable. The cable, which carried 6 toll lines required intensive maintenance and was entirely replaced 3 times before its use was abandoned in 1909. Conies (pikas) chewing on the line caused major damage, as did rock slides. From 1909 to 1916, twisted pair lines were used again, with annual replacement. Finally, in the summer of 1916, Mountain States Telephone & Telegraph Company installed a heavily engineered overhead line, hauling supplies by rail to Waldorf and then onward by pack train.

In mid 1909, the Central Colorado Power Co. began delivering power over the Shoshone Transmission Line from Glenwood Springs to Denver.

The Vidler Tunnel under Argentine Pass began with the Horseshoe tunnel, a silver mine. Reese Vidler purchased the mine in 1902 with a plan to extend it under the continental divide as a railroad tunnel. In 1952, Herbert T. Young purchased the unfinished tunnel, along with water rights on the west side of the divide, intending to finish the tunnel as a water tunnel. The  tunnel was completed in late 1968, and is currently owned by the City of Golden. In 2007, major repairs were completed to the east portal and the mined-out area of the Flossie Vein.

Climate
This climate data appears to have been taken by the builders of the Shoshone Transmission Line.

The Road Today
Vehicle travel is only possible on the Georgetown side of the pass during the summer months by a four-wheel drive vehicle with high-clearance.  The trail on the Horseshoe Basin side is only accessible by foot or by mountain bike. The pass is the highest point on the American Discovery Trail.

References

External links
 Topographical Map of Part of Clear Creek and Summit Co's Colorado, anonymous undated map of the Argentine Pass Wagon Road from Georgetown to Montezuma; it shows the Vidler Tunnel, so it must be post 1902, and it does not show the Argentine Central Railway which opened in 1906.

Rail transportation in Colorado
Mountain passes of Colorado
Landforms of Clear Creek County, Colorado
Landforms of Summit County, Colorado
Great Divide of North America
Transportation in Clear Creek County, Colorado
Transportation in Summit County, Colorado